Doris Dana (1920 – November 28, 2006) was an American translator known for having been an associate of Gabriela Mistral, the Chilean Nobel Prize winner. Dana inherited Mistral's estate following Mistral's death in January 1957.

Biography 
Dana was born into a wealthy family of New York society in 1920. They lost almost all of their money and property in the wake of the Wall Street Crash of 1929. Because part of those funds had already been set aside in trust funds for the education of Dana and her two sisters, they received a thorough education at the Lenox School. Her younger sister, Leora Dana, went on to become a stage and screen star; her older sister, Ethel Dana, became a medical doctor in California. Doris Dana received a Bachelor's degree in Classics (Latin) from Barnard College, Columbia University. 

She briefly taught night school in New York City, before writing script "treatments" in New York City during the 1950s. After until Mistral's death in 1957 she never worked full-time again.

Dana was a personal friend of Gabriela Mistral with whom she lived from 1953 until Mistral's death in 1957. Although they first met in New York in 1946, Mistral did not remember that meeting. Dana began a correspondence with her in February 1948 that led to an invitation to visit the poet at her then-residence in Santa Barbara, California. The two women intermittently traveled together in Mexico and Italy from the end of 1948 to the end of 1952, at which point Dana purchased a house in Long Island, where she supervised Mistral's end-of-life care. After the poet's death in January 1957, Doris Dana translated and edited one bilingual edition of the Selected Poems of Gabriela Mistral from Spanish to English.

Works 
Apart from the organization of Mistral's papers and the administration of the writer's estate, all three of Doris Dana's works are books drawn from the Mistral legacy, which she controlled for fifty years:

 Crickets and Frogs, a short fable for children.
 The Elephant and His Secret/El Elefante Y Su Secreto, another short fable for children.

References 

1920 births
2006 deaths
American feminist writers
Spanish–English translators
English translators
Writers from New York City
20th-century American women writers
20th-century British translators
Translators of Gabriela Mistral
21st-century American women